

Thonburi is an area of modern Bangkok. During the era of the Kingdom of Ayutthaya, its location on the right (west) bank at the mouth of the Chao Phraya River had made it an important garrison town, which is reflected in its name: thon a loanword from Pali dhána wealth and buri, from púra fortress. The full formal name was Thon Buri Si Mahasamut ( 'City of Treasures Gracing the Ocean'). For the informal name, see the history of Bangkok under Ayutthaya.

In 1767, after the sack of Ayutthaya by the Burmese, General Taksin took back Thonburi and, by right of conquest, made it the capital of the Thonburi Kingdom, with himself crown king until 6 April 1782, when he was deposed. Rama I, the newly enthroned king, moved the capital across the river, where stakes driven into the soil of Bangkok for the City Pillar at 06:45 on 21 April 1782, marking the official founding of the new capital. Thonburi remained an independent town and province, until it was merged with Bangkok in 1971. Thonburi stayed less developed than the other side of the river. Many of the traditional small waterways, khlongs, still exist there, while they are nearly gone from the other side of the river.

In 1950, Bangkok had around 1.3 million inhabitants, and the municipality of Thonburi around 400,000. In 1970 Thonburi was Thailand's second largest city proper with around 600,000 residents.

Wongwian Yai is a landmark of Thonburi District.

Administration

At the time of the merger, Thonburi province consisted of nine districts (amphoe).
Thonburi District
Bangkok Yai District
Khlong San District
Taling Chan District
Bangkok Noi District
Bang Khun Thian District
Phasi Charoen District
Nong Khaem District
Rat Burana District

As of 2012, these have been reorganized into 15 districts.

References

Further reading
 Smithies, Michael (2002), "Three military accounts of the 1688 'Revolution' in Siam", Itineria Asiatica, Orchid Press, Bangkok, .
 
 
 Knoles, Gordon D. Bangkok Page 56-57, Temples to visit in Thonburi. Retrieved, September 20, 2011 from http://www.thailand-delights.com/page1106.html - http://www.thailand-delights.com/page1107.html
 Thonburi Area | Bangkok Travel Guide & Info, Travel Information and Tourist Guide for Bangkok City. Retrieved, September 20, 2011 from http://www.bangkok-bangkok.org/sights-attractions-in-bangkok-thailand/thonburi-aera/4/
 Bangkok Palace - ComeThailand.com. Retrieved, September 20, 2011 from http://www.comethailand.com/bangkok-palace/blog
 The King Taksin Monument - a Monument to a Great Warrior. Retrieved, September 20, 2011 from http://www.tour-bangkok-legacies.com/king-taksin-monument.html
 Wat Arun - Temple of the Dawn. Retrieved, September 21, 2011 from http://www.bangkoksite.com/WatArun/WatArunPage.html

External links

Geography of Bangkok
History of Bangkok
Thon Buri district
Former provinces of Thailand

th:จังหวัดธนบุรี